Dorset is the primary settlement and a census-designated place (CDP) in the town of Dorset, Bennington County, Vermont, United States. As of the 2020 census, the CDP had a population of 360, out of 2,133 in the entire town.

It is in northern Bennington County, in the western part of the town of Dorset, in a valley between Spruce Peak to the west, Mount Aeolus to the southeast, and Dorset Mountain to the northeast. Vermont Route 30 passes through the center of the village, leading southeast  to Manchester Center and northwest  to Pawlet. The Mettawee River runs through the northern part of the CDP, flowing northwest to the southern end of Lake Champlain at Whitehall, New York.

References 

Populated places in Bennington County, Vermont
Census-designated places in Bennington County, Vermont
Census-designated places in Vermont